Crystal Gauvin is an American archer. At the 2015 World Archery Championships held in Copenhagen, Denmark she won the silver medal in the women's individual event. She switched to recurve archery with the aim to qualify for the 2020 Summer Olympics.

References

External links 
 

Living people
Year of birth missing (living people)
Place of birth missing (living people)
American female archers
World Archery Championships medalists
21st-century American women